Thomas Smith (1869 – after 1900) was a footballer who played as an outside right or inside right for both Sheffield United and Barnsley in the nineteenth century.

Born in Ecclesfield on the outskirts of Sheffield, Smith had played for his local side from 1889 until around 1890.  He was signed by Sheffield United in November 1891 but failed to break into the first team and left the following summer.  He moved to Barnsley where he played regularly for several seasons and featured in their first season in the Football League, making eleven appearances in the competition all together.

References

1869 births
English footballers
Date of death missing
Footballers from Sheffield
Association football forwards
Ecclesfield F.C. players
Sheffield United F.C. players
Barnsley F.C. players
English Football League players